Meyab or Miab or Miyab may refer to:
 Miab, East Azerbaijan, a village in northwest Iran
 Meyab, Razavi Khorasan, a village in northeast Iran

See also
 MIAB (disambiguation)